is a compilation album by the American rock band Nirvana. It consists of their 1990 non-album single "Sliver", B-sides, demos, outtakes, cover versions, and radio broadcast recordings, and as such is not the official follow-up to the band's breakthrough album, Nevermind. The album was released on December 14, 1992, in Europe, and December 15, 1992, in the United States. It eventually reached number 39 on the Billboard 200.

Background
Early in 1992, Jonathan Poneman of Sub Pop contacted Gary Gersh, who had previously signed Nirvana to DGC Records, to inform him that Sub Pop still had a number of unreleased early Nirvana recordings in their possession. The band had intended to release the material via Sub Pop and cynically called it Cash Cow. However, Sub Pop could not match Geffen Records' distribution network, and the band felt that getting the material maximum exposure was important. Sub Pop sold the recordings to Geffen for "a six-figure amount" on the condition that the band would create and approve the release of an album by Christmas 1992.

At the time, the majority of the material on Incesticide was circulating within fan communities (albeit in lower quality). It was widely reported in the music press that the band wanted to offer fans a higher-quality alternative. In the book Cobain Unseen, Charles R. Cross writes that Kurt Cobain agreed to the release of this compilation because he was allowed complete control over the album's artwork.

Since the songs were recorded in different sessions and some were recorded when Nirvana did not have a stable formation, the album includes recordings by four different drummers: Chad Channing, Dan Peters, Dale Crover, and Dave Grohl.

Songs

Previously unreleased
"Hairspray Queen"
"Aero Zeppelin"
"Big Long Now"

Alternate versions
"Been a Son"  was a song originally released on the 1989 Blew EP, the version on Incesticide was recorded in 1991 during a BBC Radio 1 live studio session.
"(New Wave) Polly" is a hard rock version of the Nevermind album track "Polly". The version on Incesticide was recorded in 1991 during a BBC Radio 1 live studio session.
"Aneurysm" was a song originally released as a b-side to the "Smells Like Teen Spirit" single, the version on Incesticide was recorded two months later during a BBC Radio 1 live studio session.

Previously released
"Dive" and "Sliver" were released on the "Sliver" single in 1990. "Dive" was also previously released on The Grunge Years compilation album in 1991.
"Stain" was released on the Blew EP in 1989.
The three cover songs, "Turnaround" (Devo), "Molly's Lips" and "Son of a Gun" (The Vaselines) were released on the Hormoaning EP in 1992, which was only released in Japan and Australia. All three songs were recorded live in 1990 during a BBC Radio 1 live studio session.
"Mexican Seafood" appeared on the 1989 Teriyaki Asthma Volume 1 compilation.
"Beeswax" appeared on the 1991 Kill Rock Stars compilation album.
"Downer" appears as a bonus track on the CD version of Nirvana's 1989 debut album, Bleach.

Artwork and packaging
The cover art was painted by Cobain, who is credited as Kurdt Kobain in the liner notes. The rubber duck seen on the album's back cover belonged to art-designer Robert Fisher. The front cover prominently displays a poppy, hinting at Cobain's struggle with heroin addiction.

The first several pressings of the album contained liner notes written by Cobain, including a statement decrying homophobia, racism and misogyny:

Versions of the album containing the liner notes by Cobain could be found at record stores as late as 1998. Initial copies in the U.S. and Canada also contained a Parental Advisory label.

Critical reception

The album received generally positive reviews. "Nobody really wants a Hatful of Hollow-type assortment of Peel/Goodier sessions, B-sides, demos and obscurities in the place of a proper studio album," observed Andrew Perry in Select. "But, hell, wouldn't you try and put an end to the consumer madness going on in your name? And harvest some of the money for yourself? Anyway, people might start talking about the music again…" In a review for AllMusic, music critic Stephen Thomas Erlewine said that the song "Aneurysm" was "perhaps the greatest single song the group ever recorded".

Commercial performance
Incesticide was released on December 14, 1992, in the United Kingdom, and on December 15, 1992, in the United States. The record label, Geffen, decided against heavily promoting the album, possibly to avoid a "Nirvana burnout" as the band had released Nevermind and four singles in the preceding fifteen months.

Despite this lack of promotion and being a collection of old and new material, Incesticide debuted at number 51 in the Billboard 200 and sold 500,000 copies in two months. The album is certified Platinum by the Recording Industry Association of America. In the United Kingdom, the album debuted at number 17, and peaked at number 14.

On November 23, 2012, Incesticide was re-released on vinyl as a limited two-LP 45 RPM edition for its 20th anniversary.

Track listing

Personnel
All sessions:
Kurt Cobain – vocals, guitar
Krist Novoselic – bass guitar

Seattle, WA: Reciprocal Recording Studios (January 23, 1988)
Nirvana's first studio demo tape.
Songs: "Beeswax," "Downer," "Mexican Seafood," "Hairspray Queen," and "Aero Zeppelin"
Dale Crover – drums
Jack Endino – producer, engineer

Seattle, WA: Reciprocal Recording Studios (December 1988 – January 1989)
The Bleach recording sessions.
Song: "Big Long Now"
Chad Channing – drums
Jack Endino – producer, engineer

Seattle, WA: Music Source Studios (September 1989)
The Blew EP recording sessions.
Song: "Stain"
Chad Channing – drums
Steve Fisk – producer

Madison, WI: Smart Studios (April 2, 1990 – April 6, 1990)
The sessions for the planned second Sub Pop album.
Song: "Dive"
Chad Channing – drums
Butch Vig – producer

Seattle, WA: Reciprocal Recording Studios (July 11, 1990)
The "Sliver" Sub Pop single session.
Song: "Sliver"
Dan Peters – drums
Jack Endino – producer, engineer

London, England: Maida Vale Studio 3 (October 21, 1990)
The 1990 BBC session for John Peel.
Songs: "Turnaround," "Molly's Lips," and "Son of a Gun"
Dave Grohl – drums
Dale Griffin – producer
Mike Engles – engineer
Fred Kay – engineer

London, England: Maida Vale Studio 4 (November 9, 1991)
The 1991 BBC session for Mark Goodier.
Songs: "Been a Son," "(New Wave) Polly," and "Aneurysm"
Dave Grohl – drums
Miti Adhikari – producer
John Taylor – engineer

Charts

Album

Certifications

References

Bibliography
Azerrad, Michael. Come As You Are: The Story of Nirvana. Doubleday, 1994. 
Cross, Charles. Heavier Than Heaven: A Biography of Kurt Cobain. Hyperion, 2001.

External links

Incesticide at YouTube (streamed copy where licensed)
Live Nirvana Companion to Official Releases - Incesticide

Nirvana (band) compilation albums
1992 compilation albums
Geffen Records compilation albums
DGC Records albums
Albums produced by Butch Vig
Albums produced by Steve Fisk
Albums produced by Jack Endino
B-side compilation albums
Peel Sessions recordings